"Love Is a Drug" is the first single released by American recording artist Rosko.  It was produced by John Creamer & Stephane K and Lance Jordan.  In April 2005, it went to number one on the American Dance/Club Play chart.

Track listing
"Love Is a Drug" [Creamer & K Original Radio Edit]
"Love Is a Drug" [Creamer & K Dub Mix]
"Love Is a Drug" [Lance Jordan XL Club Mix]
"Love Is a Drug" [Lance Jordan Beat Is Dub Mix]
"Love Is a Drug" [Creamer & K Extended Club Mix]
"Love Is a Drug" [Alternative Radio Mix]

See also
 List of number-one dance singles of 2005 (U.S.)

References

2005 singles
2005 songs